Grain size (or particle size) is the diameter of individual grains of sediment, or the lithified particles in clastic rocks.  The term may also be applied to other granular materials. This is different from the crystallite size, which refers to the size of a single crystal inside a particle or grain. A single grain can be composed of several crystals. Granular material can range from very small colloidal particles, through clay, silt, sand, gravel, and cobbles, to boulders.

Krumbein phi scale
Size ranges define limits of classes that are given names in the Wentworth scale (or Udden–Wentworth scale) used in the United States. The Krumbein phi (φ) scale, a modification of the Wentworth scale created by W. C. Krumbein in 1934, is a logarithmic scale computed by the equation

where
 is the Krumbein phi scale,
 is the diameter of the particle or grain in millimeters (Krumbein and Monk's equation) and
 is a reference diameter, equal to 1 mm (to make the equation dimensionally consistent).
This equation can be rearranged to find diameter using φ:

In some schemes, gravel is anything larger than sand (comprising granule, pebble, cobble, and boulder in the table above).

International scale
ISO 14688-1:2017, establishes the basic principles for the identification and classification of soils on the basis of those material and mass characteristics most commonly used for soils for engineering purposes. ISO 14688-1 is applicable to natural soils in situ, similar man-made materials in situ and soils redeposited by people.

Sorting
An accumulation of sediment can also be characterized by the grain size distribution. A sediment deposit can undergo sorting when a particle size range is removed by an agency such as a river or the wind. The sorting can be quantified using the Inclusive Graphic Standard Deviation:

where

 is the Inclusive Graphic Standard Deviation in phi units
 is the 84th percentile of the grain size distribution in phi units, etc.

The result of this can be described using the following terms:

See also
 Feret diameter
 Martin diameter
 Orders of magnitude (volume)
 Soil texture
 Substrate (biology)
 Unified Soil Classification System (USCS)

References

External links
 R D Dean & R A Dalrymple, Coastal Processes with Engineering Applications (Cambridge University Press, 2002)
 W C Krumbein & L L Sloss, Stratigraphy and Sedimentation, 2nd edition (Freeman, San Francisco, 1963).
 
 

Sedimentary rocks
Pedology